William L. Sayre High School (commonly referred to as Sayre High School) is a high school in Philadelphia. It was founded in 1949 as a middle school serving grades 7–9, becoming a high school in 2003. Sayre High School is also the home site of SHIELD (Sayre Health Initiatives Education and Leadership Development), a Sayre Health Center run enrichment program providing medical assistant training, health professions education, internship employment and scholarship opportunities for School District of Philadelphia high school students.

References

External links

Sayer High School Website

Sayer High School
Sayer High School
Sayer High School
Drexel Dragons men's basketball
School District of Philadelphia
Public high schools in Pennsylvania
1949 establishments in Pennsylvania